The Oli River is a river of Nigeria and Benin, tributary of the Niger River.

References

Rivers of Benin
Niger River
Rivers of Nigeria